The Institute for Development & Research in Banking Technology (IDRBT) is an engineering training institution exclusively focused on banking technology. Established by the Reserve Bank of India (RBI) in 1996, the institution works at the intersection of banking and technology. It is located in Hyderabad, India.

Research and development

The main focus of the institute is  conducting applied research and experimental development in the area of banking technology. The research at the institute is directed primarily towards a specific practical objective that will serve the banking and financial sector.

Accordingly, the research and development activities of the institute aim at improving banking technology in India. While addressing the immediate concerns of the banking sector, the research at the institute also focuses on anticipating the future needs and requirements of the banking sector and developing technologies to address them.

Focal areas of research
 Financial Networks and Applications
 Electronic Payments and Settlement Systems
 Security Technologies for the Financial Sector
 Financial Information Systems and Analytics.

Research centres

The institute has set up state-of-the-art research centres for aiding and enabling applied research. Presently, the Institute has the following six Research Centres for focused research and development directly relevant to the Indian Banking and Financial Sector

Research conferences 
The institute organises a good international conference, in an area of relevance to the institute, every year to promote exchange of the latest knowledge, experiences, research findings and technical know-how so as to attain and sustain international standards of excellence in banking technology. The main idea is to bring to the country the latest research findings in various facets of Information Technology so that the relevant ideas can be explored further and considered for application in the Indian banking and financial sector.

During the last seven years, the institute organized the following three conferences:

 15th IEEE International Conference on Advanced Network and Telecommunications Systems - ANTS 2021 (December 13 - 16, 2021) 
 12th Forum for Information Retrieval Evaluation - FIRE 2020 (December 16 - 20, 2020) 
 15th International Conference on Information Systems Security - ICISS (December 16 - 20, 2019) 
 Fifth IEEE International Conference on Identity, Security and Behavior Analysis - ISBA 2019 (January 22 - 24, 2019) 
 Fifth International Conference on Mining Intelligence and Knowledge Exploration - MIKE 2017 (December 13 - 15, 2017) 
 Eighteenth International Conference on Distributed Computing and Networking – ICDCN 2017 (January 4 – 07, 2017) 
 Fifth International Conference on Fuzzy and Neural Computing 2015 (December 17 –19, 2015) 
 Tenth International Conference on Information Systems Security – ICISS 2014 (December 18 – 20, 2014)

Academic programmes

IDRBT offers a range of academic programmes, designed specifically to meet both the existing and emerging human resources of the Indian banking and financial sector. These include:

 IDRBT Ph. D. Programme
 Postgraduate Diploma in Banking Technology (PGDBT)
 M. Tech. Programme with University of Hyderabad
 Certificate Course in Ethical Hacking

Executive education

Training programmes form an inherent part of IDRBT's initiatives in aiding technology absorption in the Indian banking and financial sector and keeping it abreast with the developments taking place in technology. The institute's programmes are structured in a way to prepare the top and middle-level managements of Banks and other Financial Institutions for the future in technology banking.

These executive development and education programmes mainly focus on identifying the gaps in the skill requirements and then provide training in those areas. The IDRBT provides holistic executive education through these programmes that cover the entire spectrum of technology which is applied in banking and financial sector. The institute offers over 100 programmes that train over 2500 bankers every year.

Banking forums

 Indian Banks’ Chief Information Officers (CIO) Forum 
 Chief Information Security Officers (CISO) Forum 
 Chief Analytics Officers (CAO) Forum 
 FinTech ForumFintech Forum

Contests

 IDRBT Banking Technology Excellence Awards
 IDRBT Banking Application Contest
 IDRBT Annual Doctoral Colloquium

IDRBT Banking Technology Excellence Awards

With the objective of instilling healthy competition and widening the reach of technology adoption and absorption in a faster way among all the banks, the institute constituted the IDRBT Banking Technology Excellence Awards  in 2001. The awards are a recognition bestowed on the banks which have implemented and improved the use of technology at all the fronts of banking activities for enhancing customer service as well as ease of doing banking.

The awards are presented keeping in view a particular aspect of technology implementation which changes year-by-year. There are various categories which focus on cyber security, financial inclusion, IT infrastructure, IT risk management, etc. These technology awards honour the best banks of the Indian banking and financial sector. The awards are presented by the governor of the Reserve Bank of India every year.

IDRBT Banking Application Contest

To bank on the popularity of apps development, and bring in new and useful app innovations in the Indian banking and financial sector, the institute launched the IDRBT Banking Application Contest (IBAC) in 2016. The IDRBT Banking Application Contest (IBAC) aims to serve two key purposes – Indian banking and financial community benefits from the innovative ideas from the best tech talent in the country, and the Gen Next gets an opportunity to showcase their tech talent through this platform.

IDRBT Annual Doctoral Colloquium

IDRBT certifying authority

IDRBT is the certifying authority (CA) for the Indian banking and financial sector, licensed by the Controller of Certifying Authorities, Government of India, under IT Act 2000. The CA issues digital certificates aimed to facilitate speedy and cost-effective digital transactions. These certificates are used by the RBI, banks and other financial institutions to exchange electronic messages between banks ensuring authenticity, integrity, non-repudiation and confidentiality. The CA services are aimed at facilitating. So far, more than 2,00,000 digital certificates have been issued by the CA.

The Indian Financial Technology and Allied Services (IFTAS)

With a view to provide focused attention and enable development of techno-banking in the country, the institute has promoted a new Section 8 company named The Indian Financial Technology and Allied Services (IFTAS). Headquartered in Mumbai, the mandate of the IFTAS is to provide IT-related services to the RBI, banks and other financial institutions.

Services like Indian Financial Network (INFINET), Structured Financial Messaging System (SFMS) and the Indian Banking Community Cloud (IBCC) have been handed over to IFTAS with effect from April 1, 2016.

References

Banking institutes
Research institutes in Hyderabad, India
Think tanks established in 1996
Reserve Bank of India
1996 establishments in Andhra Pradesh